D35 motorway, formerly Expressway R35 is a highway in the Czech Republic. Once completed, it will be the second longest highway in Czech Republic, running from Úlibice to the D1 at Lipník nad Bečvou. After completion, it will become an alternative route to motorway D1 between Prague and Olomouc and Ostrava. The first segment was opened in the 1970s.

 76 km of full motorway are in operation in two segments.

Under construction

Images

References

External links 
Info on motorway.cz 
Info on ceskedalnice.cz 
Info on dalnice-silnice.cz  
Ecology vs. R 35 

R35
Proposed roads in the Czech Republic